E. Thomas Wood (born October 9, 1963) is an American journalist, historian and freelance writer. From 2005 until 2011, he worked as a reporter for NashvillePost.com, a local business and political news website in Nashville, Tennessee, and related publications.

In the 1990s, Wood regularly contributed to The New York Times from Nashville and other locations (including Romania, where he lectured at universities in 1997), and to The Wall Street Journal. He was the founding editor of Bank Director magazine and served as editor and publisher of Nashville Life and Business Nashville magazines. He was a business reporter and interim business editor at The Tennessean in the early 1990s. Since 2012, he has worked as a staff marketing writer for the global law firm Pillsbury Winthrop Shaw Pittman LLP.

He has been a member since 1998 of the state-chartered Tennessee Holocaust Commission and since 2018 of the Metropolitan Nashville Historical Commission.

A native of Nashville, Wood is a graduate of that city's Montgomery Bell Academy (having attended Riverside Military Academy in seventh grade, 1976–77) and Vanderbilt University. He holds a Master's degree in European Studies from Pembroke College, Cambridge.

Works
Karski: How One Man Tried to Stop the Holocaust, New York: John Wiley and Sons, 1994. .
Nashville: An American Self-Portrait (co-editor), Nashville: Beaten Biscuit Press, 2001. .
Profiles in Tenacity: A Century of Stories from Nashville School of Law, Beckon Books, 2010. .
'The Suspect: A Memoir (introduction; consultant on companion documentary Indelible: The Case Against Jeffrey Womack),  Nashville: Eveready Press, 2012. .
H.G. Hill Company: A Family Tradition in Three Centuries, Nashville: Grandin Hood Publishers, 2020. .

Notes

Further reading
 "Wood, E. Thomas". Contemporary Authors. Volume 220, p. 429.
 Hoover Institution," "Partial Inventory of the E. Thomas Wood Papers"

External links
 Tennessee Holocaust Commission
 Homepage

1963 births
Living people
21st-century American historians
21st-century American male writers
People from Nashville, Tennessee
Vanderbilt University alumni
Alumni of Pembroke College, Cambridge
20th-century American journalists
American male journalists
American male non-fiction writers